Rhyton is an American experimental psychedelic rock band from Brooklyn, New York.

History
Rhyton was formed as an improvisational outfit by Dave Shuford, Jimy Seitang, and Spencer Herbst; Shuford had been a member of No Neck Blues Band and Seitang had played with Psychic Ills. The group recorded its debut album in a span of only three days, later issuing it as a self-titled effort on the label Thrill Jockey. Drummer Rob Smith, who was also a member of Pigeons, began touring with the band across the US and Europe, and subsequently replaced Herbst when he left. Rhyton began incorporating more Greek and Southern-American song forms with their improvisations, and has since released two further full-lengths on Thrill Jockey as well as two limited-edition LPs on other labels.

Discography
Rhyton (Thrill Jockey, 2011)
The Emerald Tablet (Three Lobed Recordings, 2012)
Kykeon (Thrill Jockey, 2014)
Navigating by Starlight (MIE Music, 2015)
Redshift (Thrill Jockey, 2016)

References

Psychedelic rock music groups from New York (state)
Musical groups from Brooklyn